The play-offs of the 2020 Billie Jean King Cup Europe/Africa Zone Group II were the final stages of the Group II zonal competition involving teams from Europe and Africa. Using the positions determined in their pools, the eight teams faced off to determine their placing in the 2020 Billie Jean King Cup Europe/Africa Zone Group II. The top two teams advanced to Group I, and the bottom two teams were relegated down to the Group III for 2022.

Pool results

Promotional play-offs 
The first-placed teams of each pool played against the second-placed teams of the other pool in head-to-head rounds. The winner of each round advanced to the 2022 Europe/Africa Zone Group I.

Georgia vs. Finland

Denmark vs. Tunisia

Relegation play-offs 
The third-placed and fourth-placed teams of the pools played against each other in a head-to-head round. The losers were relegated to the 2022 Europe/Africa Zone Group III.

Israel vs. Portugal

Egypt vs. Moldova

Final placements 

References

External links 
 Billie Jean King Cup website

2020–21 Billie Jean King Cup Europe/Africa Zone